God's Country and the Woman is a 1937 American Technicolor lumberjack drama film directed by William Keighley and written by Norman Reilly Raine. The film stars George Brent, Beverly Roberts, Barton MacLane, Robert Barrat, Alan Hale, Sr. and Joe King. The film is based on a 1915 novel by James Oliver Curwood entitled God's Country and the Woman and was released by Warner Bros. on January 16, 1937.

Warner Brothers' first feature-length film in full Technicolor. Filmed on location near Mount St. Helens in Washington state.

Plot
Competing lumber companies, The Russett Company and Barton Lumber Company compete for lumber in the Northwest. A lumberjack has his eye on a woman, in the midst of the forest in the Northwest.

Cast 

 George Brent as Steve Russett
 Beverly Roberts as Jo Barton
 Barton MacLane as Bullhead 
 Robert Barrat as Jefferson Russett
 Alan Hale, Sr. as Bjorn Skalka 
 Joe King as Red Munro 
 El Brendel as Ole Olson
 Addison Richards as Gaskett
 Roscoe Ates as Gander Hopkins
 Billy Bevan as Plug Hat
 Joseph Crehan as Jordan
 Bert Roach as Kewpie
 Victor Potel as Turpentine
 Mary Treen as Miss Flint
 Herbert Rawlinson as Doyle
 Harry Hayden as Barnes
 Pat Moriarity as Tim O'Toole
 Max Wagner as Gus
 Susan Fleming as Grace Moran

Reception 
Writing for Night and Day in 1937, Graham Greene gave the film a mildly poor review, commenting that "it isn't a very good film, and [the fim] is hardly improved by [the addition of] Technicolor. Focusing on the Technicolor aspect of the film, Greene suggests that there are some "very pretty shots of trees cutting huge arcs against the sky as they fall", however he notes that the "fast cutting and quick dissolves confirms [his] belief that colour will put the film back technically twelve years". Greene also wryly observed the reactions from more established critics, and quoted sections from the negative review given by The Sunday Times''' Sydney Carroll whose principal complaint had been about the heartbreaking mistreatment of the arboreal foliage by the techniques of Technicolor.

 See also God's Country and the Law (1921)God's Country'' (1946)

References

External links 
 
 
 
 

1937 films
1930s color films
1930s English-language films
Warner Bros. films
American drama films
1937 drama films
Films directed by William Keighley
Films scored by Max Steiner
Films set in forests
Films about lumberjacks
Remakes of American films
Sound film remakes of silent films
Films based on works by James Oliver Curwood
1930s American films
English-language drama films